Christian Oyer Jr. House, also known as Harmon House, is a historic home located at Barree Township in Huntingdon County, Pennsylvania. It was built about 1830, and is a two-story, five bay, rectangular Federal style stone dwelling.  It measures 32 feet by 42 feet.

It was listed on the National Register of Historic Places in 1995.

References

External links
11031 Franks Rd, Huntingdon, PA 16652, page on Zillow

Houses on the National Register of Historic Places in Pennsylvania
Federal architecture in Pennsylvania
Houses completed in 1830
Houses in Huntingdon County, Pennsylvania
1830 establishments in Pennsylvania
National Register of Historic Places in Huntingdon County, Pennsylvania